Governor Wenceslao Pascual Avenue, commonly known as simply Governor Pascual Avenue, is the principal east–west artery in the city of Malabon in Metro Manila, the Philippines. It is an unsigned route in the Philippine highway network classified by the Department of Public Works and Highways as a national tertiary road. The  two-lane avenue is the longest of the city's national roads. Portions of it are prone to flooding from the Tullahan River which flows just north of the avenue in east-central Malabon.

History
The avenue was named after Wenceslao Pascual, a Malabon native who served as the governor of Rizal from 1952 to 1955 when the then-municipality was still part of the province. The ancestral house in Hulong Duhat built in 1930 and designed by Juan Nakpil where the former governor was born is preserved by the government through a local ordinance.

Construction of the avenue commenced in September 1954 under the governorship of Wenceslao Pascual. It was completed in August 1970 and inaugurated in December of that year by Governor Isidro Rodriguez and members of the Rizal Provincial Board. The avenue, initially named Concepcion–Potrero Road, Isabel Avenue and also earlier called Bagong Daan by local residents, was converted by the Department of Public Works and Highways from a provincial road to a national road in 1984.

Route description

Governor Pascual Avenue forms a major spine of Malabon connecting barangays Potrero, Tinajeros, Acacia, Tugatog, Catmon, Baritan and Concepcion. It travels in a roughly east–west orientation following the curves of the Tullahan River from Potrero in the east to Concepcion in the west. From its eastern terminus at MacArthur Highway as a small traffic circle called Pinagtipunan Circle in Potrero, the avenue runs to the northwest for  through mainly industrial areas across Malabon's largest village. At its east end, the Malabon Zoo and Potrero Elementary School stand as notable landmarks. It turns to the west-southwest by the GIC Compound Industrial Road and crosses the Philippine National Railways line below the elevated North Luzon Expressway Harbor Link which marks the western boundary of Potrero. The road's namesake railway station can be found here as well, which was revived and in active operation since 2018.

From this junction where the Governor Pascual railway station is located, the avenue serves as the dividing line between Tinajeros and Acacia and also links to the northern edge of Tugatog near the intersection of Marcelo H. del Pilar Street. Along this section of Governor Pascual Avenue are many commercial establishments including Robinsons Town Mall Malabon. The avenue then winds its way through the heavily populated village of Catmon where the Malabon People's Park is located at a small side road just off Sanciangco Street. It then heads for an open marshland just before crossing the Lambingan Bridge to Concepcion over the Tullahan River.

West of the Lambingan Bridge, the avenue runs along the boundary between Baritan on the north side and Concepcion on the south. This section of the avenue north of Malabon's poblacion is known for its gastronomic culture and is home to several restaurants serving the city's native delicacies such as kakanin and Pancit Malabon, including Dolor's at Bernardo Street and Nanay's Pancit Malabon at Santa Ana Street. It is also the location of the José Rizal campus of Arellano University and the City of Malabon Polytechnic Institute. The avenue terminates at General Luna Street just north of the Concepcion Public Market.

References

Streets in Metro Manila